is a 1976 Japanese splatter film.  It tells two stories set in Edo period Japan: one involving a Christian girl who is taken as a slave and tortured, the other about a brothel master who tries to escape with a girl he fell in love with.  It is a follow-up to the 1968 film Shogun's Joy of Torture.

External links

1970s Japanese-language films
1976 films
1976 drama films
1976 horror films
Japanese horror drama films
Japanese splatter films
1970s exploitation films
BDSM in films
Toei Company films
1970s Japanese films